The End of Celluloid: Film futures in the digital age is a book, written by Matt Hanson and published by RotoVision in 2004, on digital cinematography, machinima, video games, music video, and other emerging film forms.

External links 
The End of Celluloid website
RotoVision website description

2004 non-fiction books
Books about film